Strongest Chil Woo (also known as Chilwu the Mighty) is a 2008 South Korean historical drama that aired on KBS2. The titular hero is similar to a Zorro during the Joseon period.

The drama served as the last project of actor Lee Eon, who died on August 21, 2008, in a motorcycle accident.

Synopsis
The series starts by stating: "Rather than being a person born in chaotic times, better to be reborn as a dog in peaceful times. However, there are some people who are born as dogs in chaotic times. This is their story."

The series occurs during the reign (1623–1649) of King Injo, the 16th ruler of Joseon. Injo was the son of Prince Jeongwon, who himself was the 7th son of King Seonjo, the 14th ruler of Joseon with Royal Noble Consort In of the Suwon Kim clan. The 15th ruler, King Gwanghaegun, was the 3rd son of Seonjo with Gongbin of the Gimhae Kim clan and therefore the Injo's uncle. In 1623, Gwanghaegun was ousted of power by a political plot from the Western faction, that puts Injo on the throne.  The turmoil of the civil war was thereafter increased by the Manchu invasions of 1627 and 1636.

Two events are the cornerstones of the series and are stepwise described during numerous flashbacks. Both of them were instigated by the conservative Western faction. One of them is the bloody extermination of the "Rising Sun Utopia" (Muryundang), occurring during the year of the Snake (Gisa year, 1629, Injo '6), and the other is the assassination of Crown Prince Sohyeon by his father in 1645 (Injo '22). The main action is situated circa 1648. While elements of these former plots are re-emerging from the past despite a series of murders, a group of mysterious assassins is avenging the sadness of the poor people.

Episodes
There are 20 episodes. The action is not linear, with many flash-backs.
 A sister to avenge
 The zealous murderer of his daughter-in-law
 Random murders at Naksu Bridge
 Manchu varlet takes a riding lesson
 Last love song of a betrayed poetess
 A thief behind an elephant at Inseong-gun
 The murder of the Unggi's leader
 Eight years ago
 Fake maebungu, true rapists
 Russian attack at Qing's border
 A broken sword
 Headbands from the past
 Malaria
 Encounter at Muryun Dang
 Legacy of Crown Prince Sohyeon
 The Secret Record disappears
 Prince's son presentation
 A cursed twist of fate
 A treacherous king
 Bad guys are dying, too

Cast

Main cast
Eric Mun as Chil-woo (칠우), sergeant at the Uigeumbu in Seoul
Choi Su-han as young Chil-woo
Koo Hye-sun as Yun So-yun (윤소윤), government slave at Uigeumbu
Lee Han-na as young So-yun
Yoo Ah-in as Heuk-san (흑산), adopted as Kim Hyuk (김혁) by Kim Ja-seon
Ku Bon-sung as young Heuk-san
Jeon No-min as Min Seung-guk (민승국), historiographer of Chunchugwan
Lee Eon as Jaja (자자), former bodyguard of Crown Prince Sohyeon
Im Ha-ryong as Choi Nam-deuk (최남득), Chil-woo's adoptive father
Song Ha-yoon as Yeon-du (연두)
Jang Jun-yeong as Cheol-seok (철석)

Extended cast
 Kim Young-ok as Chil-woo's adoptive grandmother
 Choi Ran as Chil-woo's adoptive mother
 Im Hyuk as Chief State Councilor Kim Ja-seon (김자선)
 Choi Jung-woo as King Injo
 Song Yong-tae as Uigeumbu Commissioner
 Jeong Won-jung as Uigeumbu Captain
 Son Kwang-eob as Lieutenant at Uigeumbu
 Jeong Jin as Sergeant Sa (사 나장)
 Shin Seung-hwan as Sergeant Oh (오 나장)
 Park Jun-seo as Sergeant Jeong (정 나장)
 Nam Myung-ryul as Jin Mu-yang, birth father of Heuk-san
 Park Yong-gi as Heo Won-do (허원도)
 Park Bo-young as Woo-yeong (우영), Chil-woo's younger sister 
 Kim Byeong-chan, Butler Song
 Oh Ji-young as Han Do-yeong's mother
 Cha Jae-dol as Han Do-yeong (한도영)
 Kang Jae as Jo An-jung (조안중), Son of Jinsang-gun 
 Lee Ho-seong as Jinsang-gun
 Han Ye-in as Seo Geuk-ok (서금옥), daughter of the murdered night watchman
 Woo Hyun as Kim Mal-jung (김말중), interpreter
 Park Hyo-bin as Sam-wol (삼월)
 Ko Jeong-min as Ok-byong (옥봉), famous woman poet Seok Hyeong
 Kim Hong-pyo as Kim Jo-hyeon (김조현) 
 Lee Ji-eun as Song Ju-hee (송주희)
 Jeon Yeong-bin as Mak-su (막수), leader of Heuk-san's militia
 Lee Seung-hyo as Boon-nyeo (분녀)
 Min Ah-ryeong as Min Eun-hee (민은희), Min Seung-guk's sister
 Kim Ju-yong as Yong Gol Dae (용골대), General of Qing
 Son Il-kwon as Lee Chi-seo (이치서)
 Kim Kyu-chul as Choe Won-sik (최원식)
 Nam Seong-jin as Jo Seong-du (조성두)
 Yang So-min as Crown Princess Minhoe of the Gang clan, Wife of Crown Prince Sohyeon
 Lee Seung-hyung as spy Yusaeng
 Moon Won-joo as Villager
 Cha Soon-bae as Park Geom-yeol

Cameos 
 Nam Il-wu as Kim Hong-jo (김홍조), Woo-yeong's adoptive father (episode 1~3 & 13)
 Oh Man-seok as Kang San-ha (강산하), Chil-woo's birth father (episode 1)
 Kim Ji-seok as Petitioner (episode 1)
 Kang In Duk as boss Woong-gi (episode 7)
 Im Ho as Crown Prince Sohyeon (episode 13)

Ratings

Source: TNS Media Korea

Notes

References

External links
 http://www.kbs.co.kr/drama/chilwoo/ 

Korean Broadcasting System television dramas
2008 South Korean television series debuts
2008 South Korean television series endings
Korean-language television shows
Television series set in the Joseon dynasty
South Korean action television series
South Korean historical television series